Lambda Coronae Borealis, its name Latinised from λ Coronae Borealis, is a single star in the northern constellation of Corona Borealis. In publications it is also identified as HR 5936 and HD 142908. It has a yellow-white hue and is dimly visible to the naked eye with an apparent visual magnitude of 5.43. The star is located at a distance of 136 light years based on parallax, but is drifting closer with a radial velocity of −12 km/s.

The stellar classification of Lambda Coronae Borealis is F2 IV-V, which means it is somewhat hotter than the sun and shows spectral features intermediate between a main sequence and subgiant star. It has an estimated age of 1.4 billion years with a relatively high projected rotational velocity of 76 km/s. The star has 1.6 times the mass of the Sun and 2.1 times the Sun's radius. Based on the amount of iron in the atmosphere, the elemental abundances are similar to those in the Sun. It is radiating 9.4 times the luminosity of the Sun from its photosphere at an effective temperature of 6,991 K.

The star displays an infrared excess with a signature that indicates a pair of circumstellar disks of dusty debris are orbiting the star.

A magnitude 11.44 visual companion was discovered by W. Herschel in 1782.

References 

F-type main-sequence stars
F-type subgiants
Circumstellar disks
Double stars

Corona Borealis
Corona Borealis, Lambda
Durchmusterung objects
Coronae Borealis, 12
9531
078012
078012
5936